Operation Devon was the codeword given to an amphibious landing by British Commandos at Termoli on the Adriatic coast of Italy during the Italian Campaign of World War II. It was launched on 3 October 1943, as part of the attack on the Volturno Line, and was undertaken by No. 3 Commando, No. 40 (Royal Marine) Commando and other elements of the 2nd Special Service Brigade. It was later reinforced by two brigades of the British 78th Infantry Division.

In the early hours of 3 October 1943, Nos. 3 and 40 (RM) Commandos, and elements of the Special Raiding Squadron landed behind the German lines under cover of darkness at Termoli, a seaport town on the Adriatic coast, north of the Biferno River. 40 Commando penetrated well into the town before the Germans were alerted, and brisk close-quarter fighting with German paratroopers from 1 Fallschirmjäger Division ensued. By 08:00 hours, the commandos had captured the town and controlled the approaches. So complete was the surprise that the kampfgruppe commander - Major Rau - was captured in his pyjamas and German vehicles and motorcyclists still drove into a commando ambush position until noon.

German infantry counter-attacked in strength, later supported by tanks and panzergrenadiers from 16 Panzer Division, but the commandos, together with reinforcements from the 78 Division, held off repeated infantry and armoured counter-attacks until 6 October. By noon on the 6th they had linked up with the British Eighth Army, and by noon on the 6th the enemy was in full retreat.

Aftermath
The operation was an outstanding success. They had overcome all attempts, by a force superior in numbers and armament, to dislodge them and in so doing, won a valuable harbour; they caused the enemy to withdraw from the natural defence line on the Biferno and denied them the use of the important lateral road from Naples, thereby forcing them to retreat further northwards.

The operation had been a costly one for the commandos, however. Saunders recorded that between them they lost three officers and 29 other ranks (ORs) killed, 7 officers and 78 ORs wounded, and one officer and 22 ORs missing. (He did not record the casualties among 78 Infantry Division on this operation.)

References

Conflicts in 1943
World War II British Commando raids
1943 in Italy
Province of Campobasso
D
D
D
October 1943 events
Amphibious operations involving the United Kingdom
World War II operations and battles of the Italian Campaign
Italian campaign (World War II)